Livedoid vasculopathy  is a chronic cutaneous disease seen predominantly in young to middle-aged women. One acronym used to describe its features is "Painful purpuric ulcers with reticular pattern of the lower extremities" (PURPLE).

It can be divided into a primary (or idiopathic) form and a secondary form, which has been associated with a number of diseases, including chronic venous hypertension and varicosities.

See also 
 List of cutaneous conditions
 Livedo
 Livedo reticularis
 Livedoid dermatitis

References

External links 

 

Vascular-related cutaneous conditions
Rheumatology